Marcus Joseph Wright (June 5, 1831 – December 27, 1922) was a lawyer, author, and a Confederate general in the American Civil War. He was agent for collection of Confederate records for War of the Rebellion: Official Records of the Union and Confederate Armies, a U.S. War Department publication.

Early life
Wright was born in Purdy, Tennessee. He was admitted to the Tennessee bar, and practiced law at Memphis. He was clerk of the common law and chancery court. He was lieutenant colonel of a Tennessee militia regiment designated the 154th Tennessee militia regiment. His brother was John Vines Wright.

Civil War

Wright's militia regiment was mustered into Confederate States Army service as the 154th Senior Tennessee Infantry. In 1861, Wright was ordered to establish a fortification at Randolph, Tennessee, on the Mississippi River. Fort Wright was Tennessee's first military training camp in the Civil War and is named after Marcus Joseph Wright. Later in the war Wright was the Confederate military governor of Columbus, Kentucky, from February 1862 until its evacuation, and with his regiment was present at the Battle of Belmont and the Battle of Shiloh, where he was wounded. He served on the staff of Major General Benjamin F. Cheatham during General Braxton Bragg's invasion of Kentucky where he fought at the Battle of Perryville.

Wright was promoted to brigadier general on December 13, 1862, and fought in the Tullahoma Campaign, at the Battle of Chickamauga and the Battle of Missionary Ridge. In 1863-64 he was in charge of the district of Atlanta. After the evacuation of the city he commanded at Macon, Georgia. At the end of the war, he commanded the District of North Mississippi and West Tennessee. He was paroled May 19, 1865 at Grenada, Mississippi.

Postbellum career

After the war, Wright returned to the practice of law at Memphis, He was Sheriff of Shelby County from 1870 to 1872, and for a time was assistant purser of the United States Navy Yard in Memphis, Tennessee. He became the editor of the Columbia, Tennessee, Journal newspaper, and on September 2, 1875, he married Pauline Womack of Alabama. Wright later moved to Washington, D.C., to practice law.

In 1878, Wright was appointed agent of the United States War Department for collecting Confederate military records. He worked on this project until June 1917. He published numerous magazine articles and several books, including:  
 Life of Gov. William Blount (1884)
 Life of General Scott (1894)
 Analytical Reference (1904)
 Tennessee in the War (1908)
 General Officers of the Confederate Army (1911)
 The Social Evolution of Woman (1912)

Wright died in Washington, D.C., on December 27, 1922, and was buried in Arlington National Cemetery on the south side of the Confederate Memorial. He is one of only two former Confederate generals interred in the cemetery (the other being Joseph Wheeler).

See also

List of American Civil War generals (Confederate)

Notes

Further reading
 Marcus Joseph Wright. Diary of Brigadier-General Marcus J. Wright, C.S.A.: April 23, 1861 - February 26, 1863. The University of North Carolina at Chapel Hill, 1989. 
 Eicher, John H., and David J. Eicher, Civil War High Commands. Stanford: Stanford University Press, 2001. .
 Johnson, Clint. In the Footsteps of Robert E. Lee. Winston-Salem, N.C.: John F. Blair Publisher, 2001.
 Sifakis, Stewart. Who Was Who in the Civil War. New York: Facts On File, 1988. .
 Warner, Ezra J. Generals in Gray: Lives of the Confederate Commanders. Baton Rouge: Louisiana State University Press, 1959. .

External links
Arlington National Cemetery biography of Wright
 
 
 Works by Marcus Joseph Wright at Open Library
 Men of Mark in America Biographical Sketch
 

People of Tennessee in the American Civil War
American biographers
Confederate States Army brigadier generals
People from McNairy County, Tennessee
1831 births
1922 deaths
Burials at Arlington National Cemetery